Dave Burkholder (born 1962) is a Canadian college ice hockey coach and former college player. He coached the Niagara University program from 2001 to 2017, taking over from Blaise MacDonald, a former teammate of his with the RIT Tigers. Burkholder also previously served as the assistant general manager and assistant coach of the Niagara Falls Thunder of the Ontario Hockey League.

Career
Burkholder played college ice hockey as a goaltender with the RIT Tigers, winning the 1983 Division II National Championship and being selected tournament MVP. He was a three-time ECAC First-Team All-Star and garnered all-American status in 1984.

Burkholder entered the coaching ranks in 1994 as an assistant coach and assistant GM for the Niagara Falls Thunder. Two years later he accepted an assistant coaching role with the newly created Niagara program. Burkholder remained in that position until he was named as the head coach following Blaise MacDonald leaving to take over at Massachusetts–Lowell.

Burkholder built in the success that his former teammate started, winning two conference tournaments, a pair of league title and consistently finishing near the top of the CHA standings over the next nine seasons. Once the CHA folded Niagara joined Atlantic Hockey in 2010–11. Burkholder's team played well the first several seasons, including a league title in his third year, but afterwards the program fell on hard times. For three straight years the team finished with only single-digit win totals and it was announced in the spring of 2017 that Niagara would not be bringing Burkholder back.

Head coaching record

References

External links

1962 births
Living people
Canadian ice hockey coaches
Canadian ice hockey goaltenders
Ice hockey people from Ontario
Niagara Purple Eagles men's ice hockey coaches
RIT Tigers men's ice hockey players
Sportspeople from Welland